The women's shot put was one of three women's throwing events on the Athletics at the 1964 Summer Olympics program in Tokyo.  It was held on 20 October 1964.  17 athletes from 12 nations entered, with 1 not starting the qualification round.

Results

Qualification

The qualification standard was 15.00 metres.  Each thrower had three attempts to reach that standard.

Final

The scores from the qualification were ignored, each thrower having three fresh attempts.  The top six after those three received three more, taking their best throw from the six.

References

Shot put
Shot put at the Olympics
1964 in women's athletics
Women's events at the 1964 Summer Olympics